Chamabainia is a genus of flowering plants belonging to the family Urticaceae.

Its native range is Tropical and Subtropical Asia.

Species:
 Chamabainia cuspidata Wight

References

Urticaceae
Urticaceae genera